The R525 is a Regional Route in South Africa.

Route
It is an east-west route. Its west origin is the N1 between Musina and the R523. The southern end of the R508 meets the R525 when it reaches the village of Tshipise. From there it continues east to the Pafuri Gate of the Kruger National Park.

References

Regional Routes in Limpopo